The terms river morphology and its synonym stream morphology are used to describe the shapes of river channels and how they change in shape and direction over time. The morphology of a river channel is a function of a number of processes and environmental conditions, including the composition and erodibility of the bed and banks (e.g., sand, clay, bedrock); erosion comes from the power and consistency of the current, and can effect the formation of the river's path.  Also, vegetation and the rate of plant growth; the availability of sediment; the size and composition of the sediment moving through the channel; the rate of sediment transport through the channel and the rate of deposition on the floodplain, banks, bars, and bed; and regional aggradation or degradation due to subsidence or uplift. River morphology can also be affected by human interaction, which is a way the river responds to a new factor in how the river can change its course. An example of human induced change in river morphology is dam construction, which alters the ebb flow of fluvial water and sediment, therefore creating or shrinking estuarine channels. A river regime is a dynamic equilibrium  system, which is a way of classifying rivers into different categories. The four categories of river regimes are Sinuous canali- form rivers, Sinuous point bar rivers, Sinuous braided rivers, and Non-sinuous braided rivers.

The study of river morphology is accomplished in the field of fluvial geomorphology, the scientific term.

See also

 Bedload, Suspended load
 Sediment, sedimentation, erosion 
 River, Stream, Canal
 Water, Water resource
 Flood

References

Rosgen, Dave (1996). Applied River Morphology. 2nd ed. (Fort Collins, CO: Wildland Hydrology, publ.) .
Brice J C. Planform properties of meandering rivers [C].River Meandering, Proceedings of the October 24–26, 1983 Rivers '83 Conference, ASCE. New Orleans, Louisi- ana, 1983. 1-15.

External links
River Morphology at Delft University of Technology
River Engineering and Morphology at WL | Delft Hydraulics
River morphology in Delft Cluster

 
Rivers
Hydraulic engineering
Water streams
Geomorphology
Sedimentology
Fluvial landforms